FC Bayern Munich won a historic double, clinching its first European Cup victory for more than 25 years, as well as clinching its third consecutive league title. The Champions League title was won after the unexpected late defeat to Manchester United in the final two years before.

Results

Friendlies

Opel Master Cup

Other friendlies

Bundesliga

League results

DFB-Pokal

DFB-Ligapokal

Champions League

Group stage results

1st Group Stage

2nd Group Stage

Knockout stage

Quarterfinals

Semifinals

Final

Team statistics

Squad statistics

Squad, appearances and goals 

|-
|colspan="14"|Players sold or loaned out after the start of the season:
|}

Minutes played

Bookings

Suspensions

Transfers

In
First Team

Out

Notes

References
Soccerbase.com

FC Bayern Munich seasons
Bayern Munich
UEFA Champions League-winning seasons
German football championship-winning seasons